Ivan Semyonovich Bezugly (sometimes transliterated as Bezuglyi or Bezuglyy: ; 1897–1983) was a Soviet Red Army officer who served as commander of the Red Army's 5th Airborne Corps in 1941, the first airborne corps of the Red Army to fight in World War II after the German invasion of the Soviet Union on 22 June 1941. Suffering heavy casualties just south of Daugavpils in combat against the advancing Panzer units of Army Group North in the summer of 1941, the unit made its way to the Moscow Military District on 15 August.

Promoted to lieutenant-general later in the war, Bezugly took part in the Soviet operations against Imperial Japan following the end of World War II in Europe as commanding officer of the 5th Guards Rifle Corps, which fought as part of Colonel-General Ivan Lyudnikov's 39th Army in the Soviet invasion of Manchuria in August 1945. The 5th Guards Rifle Corps captured Solun during the Manchurian operation.

References

1897 births
1983 deaths
Burials at Vagankovo Cemetery
People from Luhansk Oblast
People from Kharkov Governorate
Soviet lieutenant generals
Russian military personnel of World War I
Soviet military personnel of the Russian Civil War
People of the Polish–Soviet War
Soviet military personnel of the Winter War
Soviet military personnel of World War II from Ukraine